USS Arthur L. Bristol (APD-97), ex-DE-281, was a United States Navy high-speed transport in commission from 1945 to 1946.

Construction and commissioning
Arthur L. Bristol was laid down as the Rudderow-class destroyer escort USS Arthur L. Bristol (DE-281) on 1 December 1943 by the Charleston Navy Yard, and was launched on 19 February 1944, sponsored by Miss Ellen Wing Getty, who had been chosen for this honor by the brother of the ships namesake, the late Vice Admiral Arthur L. Bristol. The ship was reclassified as a Crosley-class high-speed transport and redesignated APD-97 on 17 July 1944. After conversion to her new role, she was commissioned on 25 June 1945.

Service history 

After fitting out, Arthur L. Bristol proceeded to Guantánamo Bay, Cuba, where she carried out shakedown training from 13 July 1945 to 7 August 1945. After a brief post-shakedown shipyard availability at Norfolk, Virginia—during which World War II came to an end on 15 August 1945—she arrived at Naval Training Center Miami at Miami, Florida, early in September 1945. Arthur L. Bristol operated in the Florida Keys and in Cuban waters as a training ship for student officers for the rest of her active career.

Ordered to Mobile, Alabama, on 31 October 1945, Arthur L. Bristol was drydocked there before shifting to Naval Repair Base Algiers at Algiers, Louisiana, to commence preinactivation preservation. Assigned to the 163rd Transport Division, 18th Transport Squadron, Sub-Group 4, Florida Group, 16th Fleet—the future Atlantic Reserve Fleet—on 1 December 1945, Arthur L. Bristol was berthed at Green Cove Springs, Florida, in the St. Johns River berthing area.

Decommissioning and disposal
Arthur L. Bristol was decommissioned at Green Cove Springs on 29 April 1946 and placed in reserve there.  Never returning to active service, she was stricken from the Naval Vessel Register on 1 June 1964 and sold for scrapping in the summer of 1965. She was transferred to her purchaser, the Boston Metals Corporation of Baltimore, Maryland, on 4 August 1965 and removed from U.S. Navy custody that day.

References

NavSource Online: Amphibious Photo Archive DE-281 / APD-97 Arthur L. Bristol

Crosley-class high speed transports
World War II amphibious warfare vessels of the United States
Ships built in Charleston, South Carolina
1944 ships